Cator Roundtop is a mountain located in the Catskill Mountains of New York south-southwest of Grand Gorge. Hack Flats is located northeast, Red Kill Ridge is located southeast, and Red Mountain is located northeast of Cator Roundtop.

References

Mountains of Delaware County, New York
Mountains of New York (state)